Pines are any coniferous tree of the genus Pinus.

Pines may also refer to:

People 
 Alexander Pines (born 1945), American chemist
 Burt Pines, American attorney and politician
 David Pines (1924–2018), American theoretical physicist
 Dinora Pines (1918–2002), British physician and psychoanalyst
 Joseph I. Pines (1922–2009), American lawyer and Judge on the Supreme Bench of Baltimore City (renamed the Circuit Court of Maryland for Baltimore City)
 Leonard Pines (born Leonard Pinckowitz, 1911–2001), American businessman
 Lois Pines (born 1940), American politician from Massachusetts
 Ned Pines (1906–1990), American publisher
 Ophir Pines-Paz (born 1961), Israeli politician
 Shlomo Pines (1908–1990), Israeli scholar of Jewish and Islamic philosophy
 Yechiel Michel Pines (1824–1913), rabbi and Zionist writer

Other uses 
 Pines a name used to shorten Pembroke Pines, Florida
 PINES or Public Information 
Network for Electronic Services
 Pines (album), a 2012 album by A Fine Frenzy
 Pines (novel), a 2012 novel by Blake Crouch in The Wayward Pines Trilogy
 Pines, Queens, a part of the Little Neck neighborhood in the Queens borough of New York City, New York, United States
 Dipper Pines, the main character of the Disney Channel series Gravity Falls
 Mabel Pines, Dipper's twin sister
 Grunkle Stan (Stanley Pines) and Stanford Pines, Dipper and Mabel's great-uncles who are also twins

See also 
 Town of Pines, Indiana
 The Pines (disambiguation) 
 Pine (disambiguation)
 
 Pinnes (c. 230–217 BC), son of Agron King of Illyria

Jewish surnames